Wilfred Andrews (1892-1975) was Chairman of the Royal Automobile Club (RAC) and the first British President of FIA.

He was instrumental in securing the use of RAF Silverstone as a motor-racing venue: Silverstone Circuit.

He appeared as a castaway on the BBC Radio programme Desert Island Discs on 27 June 1966.

He had two children, Roy and Barbara; Barbara married Kenneth Large from Goudhurst, Kent.

References

External links 

 R.A.C. Honour Jim Clark 1965 British-Pathé newsreel showing Andrews presenting medals to various racing drivers

Place of birth missing
Place of death missing
Leaders of organizations
Auto racing executives
Fédération Internationale de l'Automobile presidents
Formula One people
1892 births
1975 deaths